Paper Wheels is the eleventh studio album by American musician Trey Anastasio. The album was released on October 30, 2015, by Rubber Jungle Records.

Critical reception

Paper Wheels received generally positive reviews from music critics. Stephen Thomas Erlewine of AllMusic said, "What Anastasio achieves with Paper Wheels is tricky -- he's made a jam band record with defined hooks and songs that neither dilutes his identity or compromises it -- but he makes it seem easy."

Track listing

References

2015 albums
Trey Anastasio albums